The Puwa River (or Puwa Khola) is a river in Nepal.
It is a right tributary of the Mai Khola.

Location

The Puwa Khola is a tributary of the Mai Khola, and lies entirely within Ilam District.
A 1994 environmental impact study of the Ilam hydroelectric project found 14 species of fish in the Puwa Khola.

Farming

The Geya Danda Irrigation System uses water from the Puwa Khola to irrigate  in Puwajung, Ilam Municipality-5, Ilam District, just above the river's confluence with the Mai Khola.
The diverted water flows along a  headrace tunnel and then a  penstock pipe to the power station, which discharges it into the left bank of the Mai Khola.
This leaves very little irrigation water in the dry season.

Hydroelectricity

There are four hydroelectric plants along the river.

Notes

Sources

Rivers of Koshi Province